St. Austin Catholic School is a private, Catholic elementary and middle school with a full-time and part-time 3 year olds class, a class for 4 year olds and Kinder - 8th. St. Austin is located in downtown Austin, Texas, one block from UT campus, Dell Medical School and four blocks from the Texas State Capital. St. Austin is located within the Diocese of Austin. St. Austin offers a diverse learning environment with a great deal of individualized attention. in 2005 St. Austin received the honorable distinction of being a Blue Ribbon School. The average class size is 20 students and the teacher to student ratio is 1:9. The current enrollment at St. Austin is 215 students.

History
In September 1917 Newman Elementary School was established as the parish school for St. Austin Catholic Parish, which is administered by the Paulist Fathers. Three Dominican Sisters of Houston were given the direction of the newly established school. When an eighth grade was added for the 1941–1942 school year, the school became a complete elementary school, and the name was changed to St. Austin Catholic School.

Student Body Facts & Achievements 
 215 students
 Pre-Kindergarten 3 through 8th Grades
 Average class size of 20 
 1:9 student to teacher ratio
 Students that attend St. Austin come from 42 different zip codes in and around Austin
 1st Place in the PSIA Academic State Meet 3 years running
 Stanford Achievement Test scores rate among the top 10% schools in the nation
 Graduates place in leading Catholic, magnet and private honors programs with 60% advancing to private and 25% advancing to magnet schools
 Exemplary performance of St Austin alumni in high schools: St Michael's Catholic Academy Valedictorian (2015), National Merit Scholars, National Merit Commended Scholar and National Hispanic Scholar (2015)

Accreditation & Awards 
 Dual, Advanced Accreditation by Texas Catholic Conference and Southern Association of Colleges and Schools (SACS) Council
 National Catholic Educational Association
 Member of the Catholic Diocese of Austin
 Physically Active Learning Campus, 2015
 1st private school in Austin to be awarded the National Blue Ribbon of Excellence
 Austin Monthly Top Private Schools, 2012

Enrichment 
 National Junior's Honor Society
 Honor Roll & Principal's List
 Performing arts electives including: art, band, choir, music, dance, 1-at-play, library, PE
 Enrichment curriculum including: robotics, math pentathlon, math sense, analytics, study skills, student council
 Spanish from Pk-3 through 8th grade (70% of St. Austin students place out of Spanish 1 on entering high school)
 Technology programs from Pk-3 through 8th grades with 1:1 Chromebooks (3rd - 8th grades). Coding beginning in 3rd grade. Two 3-d printers incorporated into technology curriculum.
 Differentiated teaching and learning programs 
 After school care and classes including: Chess Club, Robotics, Art, Science Club and afterschool sports

External links
St. Austin Catholic School website

Private K–8 schools in Texas
Education in Austin, Texas
Educational institutions established in 1917
1917 establishments in Texas